The Diocese of Springfield–Cape Girardeau is a Latin Church ecclesiastical territory or diocese of the Catholic Church in Missouri, United States. The diocese is governed by Bishop Edward M. Rice. The Diocese of Springfield–Cape Girardeau is a suffragan diocese in the ecclesiastical province of the metropolitan Archdiocese of Saint Louis.

History

The diocese was formed on August 24, 1956 from the Archdiocese of St. Louis and the Diocese of Kansas City.   It consists of 39 primarily rural counties in the southern third of Missouri that include the urban areas of Springfield (the diocese headquarters), Branson and Cape Girardeau.

The diocese has two cathedrals: St. Agnes Cathedral in Springfield and the Cathedral of St. Mary of the Annunciation in Cape Girardeau.  The two cathedrals are often (mistakenly) referred to as co-cathedrals.  The diocese established the Cape Girardeau cathedral as part of an eventual plan to create a separate diocese in Cape Girardeau.

In 1975, Bishop Bernard Francis Law sponsored the priests and brothers of the Congregation of the Mother Coredemptrix who arrived from Vietnam, inviting them to buy a vacant Oblates of Mary Immaculate seminary, Our Lady of the Ozarks College in Carthage, for $1, to use as their U.S. monastery and shrine to the Immaculate Heart of Mary. Since 1978, the shrine has hosted an annual Marian Days celebration, the largest Roman Catholic festival in the United States.

Reports of sex abuse

In February 2020, retired priest Frederick Lutz was arrested after being charged with molesting a 17 year old at St. Joseph Parish in the town of Advance, Missouri in Stoddard County. Lutz had also been accused of committing sex abuse in 1972, but could not be charged for this sex abuse accusation due to the statute of limitations. In April 2020, the Diocese released the results of an investigation involving another priest who was accused of committing acts of sex abuse in Stoddard County, Father Gary Carr. The investigation, which was forwarded to the Stoddard County Prosecuting Attorney's Office, determined that Carr "made inappropriate physical/sexual contact" with one his male students nearly 30 years prior and that acts of abused occurred when the student was 10-13 years old. On July 20, 2020, the Diocese of Springfield-Cape Girardeau confessed that three other children reported to the Diocese in the late 1980s and early 1990s that they were sexually abused by Carr. Unlike the one Stoddard case, the three newer sex abuse cases against Carr involve different Missouri counties, with two being from Butler County and the other from Jasper County.

Demographics
The diocese includes 66 parishes, 19 missions, 2 chapels, and, as of a 2003 estimate, 63,179 Catholics. The diocese has an increasing Hispanic population.

This region is mainly located in the Ozarks and Bootheel of Missouri, where Catholics make up about 5% of the total population.  The religion of the Ozarks, in particular, is notably individualistic and conservative; a major Christian denomination in the region is Pentecostalism.

Each year, tens of thousands of Vietnamese American Catholics converge on Carthage, at the western end of the diocese, to participate in the Marian Days celebration.

Bishops
The bishops of the diocese and their terms of service:

 Charles Herman Helmsing (1956–1962), appointed Bishop of Kansas City-Saint Joseph
 Ignatius Jerome Strecker (1962–1969), appointed Archbishop of Kansas City in Kansas
 William Wakefield Baum (1970–1973), appointed Archbishop of Washington and later Prefect of the Congregation for Catholic Education and Major Penitentiary of the Apostolic Penitentiary (elevated to Cardinal in 1976)
 Bernard Francis Law (1973–1984), appointed Archbishop of Boston and later Archpriest of the Basilica of Saint Mary Major (created a Cardinal in 1985)
 John Joseph Leibrecht (1984–2008)
 James Vann Johnston, Jr. (2008–2015), appointed Bishop of Kansas City-Saint Joseph
 Edward M. Rice (2016–present)

High schools
 McAuley Catholic High School, Joplin
 Notre Dame High School, Cape Girardeau
 Springfield Catholic High School, Springfield

See also
 Catholic Church by country
 Catholic Church in the United States
 Ecclesiastical Province of Saint Louis
 Global organisation of the Catholic Church
 List of Roman Catholic archdioceses (by country and continent)
 List of Roman Catholic dioceses (alphabetical) (including archdioceses)
 List of Roman Catholic dioceses (structured view) (including archdioceses)
 List of the Catholic dioceses of the United States

References

External links
Roman Catholic Diocese of Springfield–Cape Girardeau Official Site

 
Springfield-Cape Girardeau
Springfield-Cape Girardeau
Christian organizations established in 1956
Springfield-Cape Girardeau